The Payment Services Act 2019 (PS Act) is a statute of the Parliament of Singapore that provides a framework for the regulation of payment systems and payment service providers in Singapore.  According to the Monetary Authority of Singapore (MAS) the PS Act provides for regulatory certainty and consumer safeguards, while encouraging innovation and growth of payment services and FinTech.

The PS Act regulated seven activities: (1) account issuance services, (2) domestic money transfer services, (3) cross-border money transfer services, (4) merchant acquisition, (5) electronic money issuance, (6) digital payment token services and (7) money-changing services.  The PS Act does not currently offer licensing for custodial services, although that MAS has published a consultation paper regarding the potential expansion of the PS Act to license custodial wallets.

The PS Act came into effect on 28 January 2020.

Reference list

External links
Payment Services Act 2019 - Singapore Statutes Online
MAS summary of the PS Act
Library of materials on the PS Act
FAQs - Payment Services Act 2019

2019 in law
2019 in Singapore
Singaporean legislation